Jennifer Loewenstein is politically active in Madison, Wisconsin, and writes as a freelance journalist. Her work has appeared in academic journals such as The Journal of Palestine Studies, and she is a regular contributor to CounterPunch magazine.

Background
Loewenstein lived in Israel in 1963 as a child when her father played first trumpet in the Israel Philharmonic Orchestra. She returned in 1981 as a junior in college, and later as an adult. Loewenstein has lived in Palestinian refugee camps in Beirut and traveled in the Palestinian Territories, where she worked for five months in 2002 at the Mezan Center for Human Rights in Gaza City. She has returned to Gaza several times since then.

Activism
Loewenstein is a member of the USA board of the Israeli Committee Against House Demolitions and founder of the Madison-Rafah Sister City Project. As a local political activist, she has helped organize demonstrations in Madison. On the day after Ariel Sharon's  election as Prime Minister of Israel, she was among the organizers of an anti-Likud demonstration. She helped organize protests against the 2003 US-led invasion of Iraq, and she occasionally makes arrangements for political activists or journalists to speak at American universities. 
 
The proposed Madison-Rafah Sister City Project occasioned an "anguished and bruising debate" in Madison.
During the debate, Loewenstein called the executive board of the Madison Jewish Community Council "deeply racist." Board Member Lester Pines alleged that Loewenstein's project was part of a "movement to delegitimize the state of Israel."

Loewenstein writes that:

Journalism

Loewenstein traveled to the Gaza Strip soon after the end of the Second Intifada, where she wrote for the Palestine Chronicle. Her description of the aftermath of the Israeli rocket attack that killed Salah Shehade criticized Israel for its collateral slaying of 14 civilians. She has written that Israel has little interest in peace owing to its military and strategic advantage over the Palestinians, and is characterizes Israeli policy as "racist". 

Loewenstein was outspoken about Operation Cast Lead and American coverage of the event. This prompted a vitriolic response from conservative activist David Horowitz, who called her an "ignoramus and a moral defective", a "self-hating Jew" and a "capo." Horowitz has stated that Loewenstein represents a Western fifth column of "Islamic barbarism" that endangers America and Israel.

References

Living people
Jewish anti-Zionism in the United States
American activists
University of Wisconsin–Madison faculty
Year of birth missing (living people)
People from Madison, Wisconsin